Binegar is a small village and civil parish in Somerset, England. Its population in 2011 was 313. Binegar and Gurney Slade on the opposite side of the A37 are effectively a single village and share a sign on the main road. In Gurney Slade, the quarry and houses on the north side of Tape Lane are in Binegar parish whilst the south side is in Ashwick parish. In Binegar, some houses on the south side of Station Road are in Ashwick parish and some on the north side of the village are in Emborough parish.

History

The village had one Church of England Voluntary Controlled primary school, which was shut at the end of 2011, one very old church, post office, and smattering of houses. It also has 2 pubs, the Horse & Jockey and The George.

It used to have a station on the Somerset and Dorset Joint Railway, which closed in 1966, and was the site of accidents on the line in 1885 and 1886.

The name of the village was Begenhangra, in a charter of 1065, which probably meant the slope where beans are grown. It formed part of the endowment of Wells Cathedral.

Calamine ore was mined at Merchants Hill in the late 18th century, but the area's principal focus was on limestone quarrying, at Gurney Slade quarry, and agriculture. Adjacent to the quarry there is now a plant which processes powdered material (known as filler) from various Mendip quarries.

The parish was part of the hundred of Wells Forum.

Governance

The parish council has responsibility for local issues, including setting an annual precept (local rate) to cover the council's operating costs and producing annual accounts for public scrutiny. The parish council evaluates local planning applications and works with the local police, district council officers, and neighbourhood watch groups on matters of crime, security, and traffic. The parish council's role also includes initiating projects for the maintenance and repair of parish facilities, as well as consulting with the district council on the maintenance, repair, and improvement of highways, drainage, footpaths, public transport, and street cleaning. Conservation matters (including trees and listed buildings) and environmental issues are also the responsibility of the council.

The village falls within the Non-metropolitan district of Mendip, which was formed on 1 April 1974 under the Local Government Act 1972, having previously been part of Shepton Mallet Rural District, which is responsible for local planning and building control, local roads, council housing, environmental health, markets and fairs, refuse collection and recycling, cemeteries and crematoria, leisure services, parks, and tourism.

Somerset County Council is responsible for running the largest and most expensive local services such as education, social services, libraries, main roads, public transport, policing and fire services, trading standards, waste disposal and strategic planning.

It is also part of the Wells county constituency represented in the House of Commons of the Parliament of the United Kingdom. It elects one Member of Parliament (MP) by the first past the post system of election. It was part of the South West England constituency of the European Parliament prior to Britain leaving the European Union in January 2020, which elected seven MEPs using the d'Hondt method of party-list proportional representation.

Religious sites

The Norman Church of the Holy Trinity was rebuilt in the 15th century, and again rebuilt (except for the tower) in 1858 for Rev William Heade. The tower contains two bells dating from 1776 and made by William Bilbie of the Bilbie family. It has been designated by English Heritage as a Grade II* listed building.

References

External links

Villages in Mendip District
Civil parishes in Somerset